Kurvoshsky Pogost is a rural locality (a village) in Oshtinskoye Rural Settlement, Vytegorsky District, Vologda Oblast, Russia. The population was 177 as of 2002.

Geography 
Kurvoshsky Pogost is located 77 km southwest of Vytegra (the district's administrative centre) by road. Ruchey is the nearest rural locality.

References 

Rural localities in Vytegorsky District